Kirill Aleksandrovich Kochubei (born 6 October 1986) is a Russian former football midfielder.

Club career
He made two appearances (67 mins.) for CSKA Moscow in UEFA Champions League 2006-07.

External links
uefa.com short bios.

1986 births
Sportspeople from Nalchik
Living people
Russian footballers
Russia youth international footballers
Russia under-21 international footballers
PFC CSKA Moscow players
Association football midfielders
FC Anzhi Makhachkala players
PFC Spartak Nalchik players
FC Chernomorets Novorossiysk players
Russian Premier League players
FC Rotor Volgograd players
FC SKA-Khabarovsk players
FC Luch Vladivostok players
FC Armavir players